The 2011 Trofeo Linea Brasil  season is the second Trofeo Linea Brasil season.

Three race ahead, Cacá Bueno won the title of champion by winning the Trofeo Linea nine round of the season, held at the Curitiba.

Bueno won five races during the season including sweeping the weekend at Londrina, as well as a victory at the first meeting to be held in Interlagos, Brasília and Curitiba. In second place was his brother Popo Bueno, who won at first meeting in Interlagos. Giuliano Lossaco finished in third place, winning two races at the second meeting to be held in Interlagos and Curitiba. Other wins were taken by André Bragantini in second meeting at Interlagos and Velopark, Allam Khodair in Brasília and Cesinha Bonilha won the victory in the last race on Velopark.

Teams and drivers
All cars are powered by FPT engines and use Fiat Linea chassis.

Race calendar and results

Championship standings
Points were awarded as follows:

References

External links
 Official website of the Trofeo Linea Brasil

Trofeo Linea season
Copa Fiat Brasil